Mosvik og Verran is a former municipality in the old Nord-Trøndelag county in Norway. The  municipality existed from 1867 until 1901 when it was split into two.  It was located on the Fosen peninsula, on the west side of the Trondheimsfjord. It included the southern part of what is now the municipality of Inderøy and the southern part of the present municipality of Steinkjer. The municipality was centered around the Verrasundet strait, a branch of the Trondheimsfjord. The administrative centre was the village of Mosvik where the Mosvik Church was located.

History
The municipality of Mosvik og Verran was established on 1 January 1867 when the western part of the large municipality of Ytterøy was separated to form a new municipality. Initially, Mosvik og Verran had a population of 2,949. On 1 January 1901, Mosvik og Verran was divided to create two new municipalities: Mosvik (population: 969) in the southeast and Verran (population: 1,456) in the north and west. The municipality of Mosvik has continued with these borders until 2012 when it will merge with neighboring Inderøy municipality. Verran continued until 1 January 1964 when it was merged with Malm to form a new, larger municipality of Verran.

Mayors
The municipality of Mosvik og Verran was led by three different mayors during its existence.
1867–1882: Benedict Jenssen 	
1883–1898: Martin Følstad 	
1899–1901: Jørginius Stavrum

Name
The municipal name is a compound name made up of the two parishes that made up the municipality, literally meaning Mosvik and Verran.

The Old Norse form of the first name was Masarvík. The first element is the genitive case of the river name Mǫs (now Mossa) and the last element (Old Norse: Vík) is identical with the word vik which means "inlet" or "cove". The name has historically been spelled Mosviken.

The second name comes from the local Verrasundet fjord (Old Norse: Veri), which is an arm of the great Trondheimsfjord. The meaning of the old name is probably "the quiet one" or "the fjord with still water".

See also
List of former municipalities of Norway

References

Mosvik
Steinkjer
Inderøy
Former municipalities of Norway
1867 establishments in Norway
1901 disestablishments in Norway